The Spirit of Apollo is the debut album by N.A.S.A., a hip hop duo consisting of Squeak E. Clean and DJ Zegon. It was released on ANTI- in 2009.

The track, "N.A.S.A. Anthem", was featured on the official NASA Glenn Research Center website as "NASA Anthem". The album features guest appearances from Kanye West, David Byrne, Tom Waits, RZA, Kool Keith, Chuck D, John Frusciante, Method Man, M.I.A, Santigold, Seu Jorge, George Clinton, Spank Rock, Chali 2na, KRS-One, Lykke Li, Ghostface Killah, Karen O, and Ol' Dirty Bastard, amongst others.

Reception
At Metacritic, which assigns a normalized rating out of 100 to reviews from critics, The Spirit of Apollo received an average score of 64 based on 24 reviews, indicating "generally favorable reviews".

Zeth Lundy of The Phoenix said: "The beats are eminently funky, the rhymes tight, and the topics decidedly old-school: plain-spoken boasts, the rejection of greed, and an acknowledgment of our communal evolution indicate the overall tone." Meanwhile, John Bush of AllMusic said: "Few of the guests stand out, none of them seem to be speaking to each other, and the result is, ironically, a Babel of voices and sounds that doesn't communicate much of anything."

Track listing

Charts

References

External links
 

2009 debut albums
Anti- (record label) albums